Segundo Ignacio Batallán (born April 29, 1984 in Catamarca) is a Hispano-Argentinean volleyball and beach volleyball player. He is 1.93 m tall and plays Opposite. He is also well known for his unconventional body which earned him the nickname of “Hercules” and enabled him to work as a model.

Career

Volleyball

Teams

Career 
Nacho started his career in Catamarca (Argentina) in the National University of Catamarca team, then he moved to Associacion bancaria team.

When he went to study in Cordoba, he played in the Club Municipalidad de Córdoba, in the Social y Deportivo La Calera club, and in the General Paz Juniors Volleyball, with which he played the Argentinean League A2 Level season 2004–2005.

The 2008–2009 season, he moved to Spain, where he played in the AD Voleibol Almendralejo team, and passed to the upper category, the Men's Liga FEV, being the absolute champion of the first division, with 22 wins and no losses.

In 2010 he stayed in the same team and then went to the Spain Volleyball Championships 2.

The 2010–2011 season, he played in the Multicaja Fabregas Sport, Zarragoza club, which finished the 2010–2011 season in 9th place of the Championships, and 2011–2012 season in 6th. Nacho has been in the top 10 best scorers of the Spain Volleyball Championships for seven days.

Since September 2013, he has trained the Club Voleibol Fuengirola teams. Nacho has represented the Club Voleibol Fuengirola as a player and he is also the president.
In June 2014, he received the award for the best sportsman of 2013 from the city of Fuengirola.

Beach volleyball

Teammates

Honours and awards 
 2011 : 9th satellite event of CEV in Vaduz
 2013 :  I Internacionales Ciudad de Valladolid, Madison Beach Volley Tour
 2013 :  I Internacionales Ciudad de Cambrils, Madison Beach Volley Tour
 2013 :  I Internacionales Villa de Laredo, Madison Beach Volley Tour
 2013 :  I Internacionales de Santanyi Cala D'or, Madison Beach Volley Tour
 2013 :  Spanish Championship
 2013 :  Madison Beach Volley Tour
 2014 :  I Internacionales de Ibiza, Madison Beach Volley Tour
 2014 :  II Internacionales Villa de Laredo, Madison Beach Volley Tour
 2014 :  I Internacionales de Tarragona, Madison Beach Volley Tour
 2014 :  Madison Beach Volley Tour
 2014 :  Spanish Championship
 2015 :  III Internacionales Villa de Laredo Madison Beach Volley Tour
 2015 :  Trust Kapital OPEN, Kuopio, Finland.
 2015 :  Spanish Championship

Career 
Nacho played the Barcelona FIVB Beach Volleyball World Tour, with Rafael Gárzon. They finished in 57th position. In 2011, he played with Gabriel FernÁndez the Brasilia FIVB Beach Volleyball World Tour, where they finished in the same position and the satellite event of Vaduz (Liechtenstein )European Beach Volleyball Championships where they finished ninth.

In 2013 he teams up with Miguel Ángel De Amo in the Batallán-De Amo team, with whom he played the Madison Beach Volley Tour. They were finalists in the first Internacionales Ciudad de Valladolid, they won the I Internacionales Ciudad de Cambrils and they were finalists in the I Internacionales Villa de Laredo and I Internacionales de Santanyi Cala D'or.  They ended up being the subchampions of Spain in Reserva del Higuerón (Fuengirola).

In 2013, he and Miguel Ángel De Amo were placed second in the Spanish beach volleyball championship.

In summer 2014, he finished first along with Miguel Ángel De Amo in the following Internacionales: Ciudad de Ibiza, Villa de Laredo and Tarragona. They were also Madison Beach Volley Tour Champions and bronze medallists in the Spanish Championship in Fuengirola.

In July 2015, he won the III Internacionales Villa de Laredo with his partner Miguel Ángel de Amo, he also win the Trust Kapital OPEN in Kuopio (Finland) and then in August he becomes Spanish Championship runner up at the Reserva de Higuerón (Fuengirola).

References

External links 
 
 
 Batallàn-De Amo team page

1984 births
Living people
Spanish beach volleyball players
Spanish men's volleyball players
Argentine beach volleyball players
Argentine men's volleyball players
Men's beach volleyball players
Argentine emigrants to Spain
People from Catamarca Province